Greece and Ellinikí Radiofonía Tileórasi (ERT) chose to host a National Selection with the winner being chosen an "expert" jury. Christie Stasinopoulou was chosen with "Mou les" and placed 14th at Eurovision.

Before Eurovision

National final 
The final took place on 18 March 1983 at the ERT TV Studios in Peania and was hosted by Mako Georgiadou. Originally, there were 11 songs taking part, but song 7, "Horos tis nichtas" by Petros Dourdouvakis was possibly disqualified, as it was not included in the voting results. The winning song was chosen by a 50-member jury composed of "experts" and members of the public.

At Eurovision 
"Mou les" was performed tenth on the night (following Finland's Ami Aspelund with "Fantasiaa" and preceding the Netherlands' Bernadette with "Sing Me a Song"). At the close of voting, it had received 32 points, placing 14th in a field of 20.

Greece did not enter the 1984 Contest. Thus, the song was succeeded as Greek representative at the 1985 Contest by Takis Biniaris with "Miazoume".

Voting

References 

1983
Countries in the Eurovision Song Contest 1983
Eurovision